Pardis Pourabedini (Persian: پردیس پورعابدینی; born April 10, 2000) is an Iranian actress. She is best known for her role as Razieh in Blue Blood (2020–2021) for which she earned a Hafez Award nomination. She won the Crystal Simorgh for Best Actress at the 41st Fajr International Film Festival for her role in the 2023 war film The Strange.

Personal life 
She has two sisters. Her mother is a hairdresser and her father Babak Pourabedini is the CEO of Sofar Company.

Filmography

Film

Web

Television

Theatre

Awards and nominations

See also 

 Iranian women
 Iranian cinema

References

External links

Pardis Pourabedini on Instagram

Living people
Iranian film actresses
People from Tehran
Iranian actresses
2000 births